Kyrin Galloway (born 10 July 1999) is an American-Australian professional basketball player for the Adelaide 36ers of the Australian National Basketball League (NBL). He played college basketball for the UNC Greensboro Spartans.

High school career
Galloway attended Milton High School. As a senior, he averaged 14 points, 10 rebounds, and 4 blocks per game. Galloway was named to the All-Region team and led Milton to a 2016 Final Four appearance.

College career
As a freshman, Galloway posted 2.2 points and 2.2 rebounds per game off the bench. He averaged 5.7 points and 4.4 rebounds per game as a sophomore. On 9 November 2018, Galloway scored a career-high 32 points in a 97-91 loss to LSU. He averaged 9.4 points and 4.3 rebounds per game as a junior. As a senior, Galloway averaged 8.6 points, 4.1 rebounds and a Southern Conference-leading 1.7 blocks per game, shooting 39.8 percent from the field.

Professional career
On 14 July 2020, Galloway signed a three-year deal with the New Zealand Breakers of the Australian National Basketball League, with the first season as a developmental player and the next two as a fully contracted player. On 5 June 2021, he was added to the roster of the Franklin Bulls of the New Zealand league. In his first game, Galloway posted 22 points, 14 rebounds and four assists in a 118–86 loss to the Manawatu Jets.

Following the 2021–22 NBL season, Galloway played for the Mackay Meteors of the NBL1 North.

On 26 May 2022, Galloway signed a two-year deal with the Adelaide 36ers.

National team career
Galloway has represented Australia in several international tournaments. In 2019, he helped Australia win bronze at the Summer Universiade in Italy.

Personal life
Galloway has an American father Erin and an Australian mother Kylie. Both his parents played basketball collegiately at the University of Hawaii, after his mother transferred from San Jose State. His mother played professionally in Townsville.

References

External links 
UNC Greensboro Spartans profile
"How Kyrin Galloway's Mum Steered him to the Sky Sport Breakers" at nzbreakers.basketball

1999 births
Living people
Australian people of African-American descent
Australian men's basketball players
Australian expatriate basketball people in the United States
Australian expatriate basketball people in New Zealand
Power forwards (basketball)
Franklin Bulls players
UNC Greensboro Spartans men's basketball players
Universiade medalists in basketball
Universiade bronze medalists for Australia
Medalists at the 2019 Summer Universiade